Timepass 3 is a 2022 Marathi language romantic comedy drama film directed by Ravi Jadhav and produced by Meghana Jadhav. It is the third installment of the Timepass series. The film stars Prathamesh Parab, Hruta Durgule and Bhalchandra Kadam in lead roles along with Sanjay Narvekar and Vaibhav Mangle in supporting cast. The story revolves around Dagdu Shantaram Parab.

Plot 
After finally passing his 12th exam, Dagdu Parb is ready to start fresh after taking admission in Science College.  His bonding with classmate Palvi is also blooming.

Cast 
 Prathamesh Parab as Dagdu Shantaram Parab 
 Hruta Durgule as Palvi Dinkar Patil 
 Sanjay Narvekar as Dinkar Patil
 Bhau Kadam as Shantaram Parab
 Vaibhav Mangle as Madhav Lele 
 Rakesh Bhavsar 
 Samir Choughule as College principal 
 Manmeet Pem as Balbharti 
 Anvita Phaltankar as Chanda 
 Onkar Raut as Komdya 
 Jayesh Chavan as Malaria
 Prashant Tapasvi as College peon

References

External links 
 
Timepass 3 on ZEE5

2022 films
2020s Marathi-language films